Carl Henry Vogt (February 19, 1895 – May 12, 1956), known professionally as Louis Calhern, was an American stage and screen actor. Well known to film noir fans for his role as the pivotal villain in 1950's The Asphalt Jungle, he was nominated for the Academy Award for Best Actor for portraying Oliver Wendell Holmes in the film The Magnificent Yankee later that year.

Early life
Calhern was born Carl Henry Vogt in Brooklyn, New York, in 1895, the son of German immigrants Eugene Adolf Vogt and Hubertina Friese Vogt. He had one known sibling, a sister. His father was a tobacco dealer. His family left New York while he was in elementary school  and moved to St. Louis, Missouri, where he was raised. While playing high school football, a stage manager from a touring theatrical stock company noticed the tall, handsome youth and hired him as a bit player. Another source states "Grace George hired his entire high school football team as supers for a Shakespearean play." Due to the anti-German sentiment during World War I, he changed his German given name, Carl. His stage name is an amalgam of his hometown of St. Louis and his first and middle names, Carl and Henry (Calhern).

Stage
Just before World War I, Calhern returned to New York to pursue an acting career. He began as a prop boy and bit player with various touring and burlesque companies. He became a matinee idol after being in a play titled Cobra. 

Calhern's Broadway credits include:

 Roger Bloomer (1923)
 The Song and Dance Man (1923–1924)
 Cobra (1924)
 In a Garden (1925–1926)
 Hedda Gabler (1926)
 The Woman Disputed (1926–1927)
 Up the Line (1926)
 The Dark (1927)
 Savages Under the Skin (1927)
 A Distant Drum (1928)
 Gypsy (1929)
 The Love Duel (1929)
 The Rhapsody (1930)
 The Tyrant (1930)
 Give Me Yesterday (1931)
 Brief Moment (1931–1932)
 The Inside Story (1932)
 Birthday (1934–1935)
 Hell Freezes Over (1935–1936)
 Robin Landing (1937)
 Summer Night (1939)
 The Great Big Doorstep (1942)
 Jacobowsky and the Colonel (1944–1945)
 The Magnificent Yankee (1946)
 The Survivors (1948)
 The Play's the Thing (1948)
 King Lear (1950–1951)
 The Wooden Dish (1955)

Military service
Calhern's burgeoning career was interrupted by World War I; he served in France in the 143rd Field Artillery of the U.S. Army.

Film

Calhern began working in silent films for director Lois Weber in the early 1920s, the most notable being The Blot (1921). A newspaper article commented: "The new arrival in stardom is Louis Calhern, who, until Miss Weber engaged him to enact the leading male role in What's Worth While?, had been playing leads in the Morosco Stock company of Los Angeles."

In 1923, Calhern left the movies, deciding to devote his career entirely to the stage, but returned to the screen in the sound era. In films he was primarily cast as a character actor, while he continued to play leading roles on the stage. Among Calhern's notable portrayals were as the partner in crime to Spencer Tracy and Bette Davis in 20,000 Years in Sing Sing (1932), as Ambassador Trentino in the Marx Brothers comedy Duck Soup (1933), and as the spy boss of Cary Grant in Alfred Hitchcock's Notorious (1946).

Calhern was acclaimed for three diverse roles that he appeared in at Metro-Goldwyn-Mayer in 1950: a singing role as Buffalo Bill in the film version of the musical Annie Get Your Gun; as a double-crossing lawyer and sugar daddy to Marilyn Monroe in John Huston's The Asphalt Jungle; and his Oscar-nominated performance as Oliver Wendell Holmes in The Magnificent Yankee (re-creating his role from the Broadway stage). He was also praised for his portrayal of the title role in the John Houseman production of Julius Caesar (adapted from the Shakespeare play) in 1953, directed by Joseph L. Mankiewicz. 

Calhern played the role of the devious George Caswell, the manipulative board member of Tredway Corporation, in the 1954 production of Executive Suite, followed by the role of a jaded, acerbic high school teacher in The Blackboard Jungle (1955). His performance as lecherous Uncle Willie in High Society (1956), a musical remake of The Philadelphia Story, was his final film appearance.

Personal life
Calhern battled alcoholism for much of his adult life; as a result, he lost several important screen and stage roles. According to former wife Schafer, Calhern's inability to overcome his addiction ended their marriage. While he was willing to consult doctors, she said Calhern refused to attend Alcoholics Anonymous because he was an atheist and considered AA to be a religious organization. Calhern ultimately overcame his alcohol addiction by the late 1940s.

Death
Calhern died May 12, 1956, at age 61 of a sudden heart attack in Nara, Japan, while there to film The Teahouse of the August Moon. His body was cremated and his remains interred at Hollywood Forever Cemetery in Los Angeles, California.

Selected filmography

 What's Worth While? (1921) as "Squire" Elton
 Too Wise Wives (1921) as Mr. David Graham
 The Blot (1921) as The Professor's Pupil as Phil West
 Woman, Wake Up (1922) as Monte Collins
 The Last Moment (1923) as Harry Gaines
 Stolen Heaven (1931) as Steve Perry
 The Road to Singapore (1931) as Dr. George March
 Blonde Crazy (1931) as Dapper Dan Barker
 Okay, America! (1932) as Mileaway Russell
 Night After Night (1932) as Dick Bolton
 They Call It Sin (1932) as Ford Humphries
 Afraid to Talk (1932) as Asst. District Attorney John Wade
 20,000 Years in Sing Sing (1932) as Joe Finn
 Frisco Jenny (1932) as Steve Dutton
 The Woman Accused (1933) as Leo Young
 Strictly Personal (1933) as Magruder
 The World Gone Mad (1933) as Christopher Bruno
 Diplomaniacs (1933) as Winkelreid
 Duck Soup (1933) as Ambassador Trentino of Sylvania
 The Count of Monte Cristo (1934) as De Villefort Jr.
 The Man with Two Faces (1934) as Stanley Vance
 The Affairs of Cellini (1934) as Ottaviano
 Sweet Adeline (1934) as Major Day
 The Arizonian (1935) as Sheriff Jake Mannen
 Woman Wanted (1935) as Smiley
 The Last Days of Pompei (1935) as Prefect
 The Gorgeous Hussy (1936) as Sunderland
 Her Husband Lies (1937) as Joe Sorrell
 The Life of Emile Zola (1937) as Major Dort
 Fast Company (1938) as Elias Z. "Eli" Bannerman
 Juarez (1939) as Le Marc
 5th Ave Girl (1939) as Dr. Kessler
 Charlie McCarthy, Detective (1939) as Arthur Aldrich
 I Take This Woman (1940) as Dr. Duveen
 Dr. Ehrlich's Magic Bullet (1940) as Dr. Brockdorf
 Heaven Can Wait (1943) as Randolph Van Cleve
 Nobody's Darling (1943) as Curtis Farnsworth
 The Bridge of San Luis Rey (1944) as Don Andre, The Viceroy
 Up in Arms (1944) as Colonel Ashley
 Notorious (1946) as Captain Paul Prescott
 Arch of Triumph (1948) as "Col." Boris Morosov
 The Red Pony (1949) as Grandfather
 The Red Danube (1949) as Colonel Piniev
 Nancy Goes to Rio (1950) as Gregory Elliott
 Annie Get Your Gun (1950) as Colonel William "Buffalo Bill" Cody
 The Asphalt Jungle (1950) as Alonzo D. Emmerich
 A Life of Her Own (1950) as Jim Leversoe
 Devil's Doorway (1950) as Verne Coolan
 Two Weeks with Love (1950) as Horatio Robinson
 The Magnificent Yankee (1950) as Oliver Wendell Holmes
 It's a Big Country (1951) as narrator
 The Man with a Cloak (1951) as Charles Francois Thevenet
 A Letter from a Soldier (1951 short) as narrator
 Invitation (1952) as Simon Bowker
 Washington Story (1952) as Charles W. Birch
 We're Not Married! (1952) as Frederick C. "Freddie" Melrose
 The Prisoner of Zenda (1952) as Col. Zapt
 The Bad and the Beautiful (1952) as voice of Georgia Lorrison's Father
 Confidentially Connie (1953) as Opie Bedloe
 Julius Caesar (1953) as Julius Caesar
 Remains to Be Seen (1953) as Benjamin Goodman
 Latin Lovers (1953) as Grandfather Eduardo Santos
 Main Street to Broadway (1953) as himself
 Executive Suite (1954) as George Nyle Caswell
 Rhapsody (1954) as Nicholas Durant
 Men of the Fighting Lady (1954) as James A. Michener
 The Student Prince (1954) as King Ferdinand of Karlsberg
 Betrayed (1954) as General Ten Eyck
 Athena (1954) as Grandpa Ulysses Mulvain
 The Prodigal (1955) as Nahreeb
 Blackboard Jungle (1955) as Jim Murdock
 Forever, Darling (1956) as Charles Y. Bewell
 High Society (1956) as Uncle Willie

References

External links

 
 
 
 Wedding photograph of Louis Calhern and Natalie Schafer, Glendale, 1933. Los Angeles Times Photographic Archive (Collection 1429). UCLA Library Special Collections, Charles E. Young Research Library, University of California, Los Angeles.

1895 births
1956 deaths
American male film actors
American male stage actors
American male silent film actors
American people of German descent
Burials at Hollywood Forever Cemetery
Male actors from St. Louis
Donaldson Award winners
20th-century American male actors
Male actors from New York City
United States Army personnel of World War I
People from Brooklyn